The Dunedin Causeway is a series of three bridges (the outer ones are the fixed bridges, and the middle one a double-leaf bascule bridge) that cross the St. Joseph Sound, part of the Gulf Intracoastal Waterway, connecting the barrier islands of Honeymoon Island State Park and the mainland of Dunedin, Florida. The causeway carries CR 586 and it was built in 1963.

The causeway is lined on each side by water with vistas of St. Joseph Sound and plenty of free parking along the access areas that parallel the main roadway.

See also 
 Clearwater Memorial Causeway
 Sand Key Bridge
 Belleair Causeway
 Indian Rocks Causeway
 Park Boulevard Bridge
 Tom Stuart Causeway
 John's Pass Bridge
 Treasure Island Causeway
 Corey Causeway
 Pinellas Bayway

References 

Bridges in Florida
Dunedin, Florida